Right Here is the debut solo album of New Zealand singer/songwriter Boh Runga, released in May, 2009. Right Here was recorded in Marshall Altman's Hollywood studio and includes the singles "Starfish Sleeping" and "Evelyn."

The album gained positive reviews in New Zealand. The New Zealand Herald rated the album 4 out of 5 stars, noting “its unashamed blockbuster urges and tunepower make it all the more irresistible”  and Real Groove called it “an assured collection of streamlined tunes that’s guaranteed to surf the airwaves.”

Track listing
Track listing and credits adapted from Spotify.

Charts

Weekly charts

References

External links
Song Meanings on Runga's Official Website

Boh Runga albums
2009 albums